Hakkari is an electoral district of the Grand National Assembly of Turkey which corresponds to Hakkâri Province. It elects three members of parliament (deputies) to represent the province of the same name for a four-year term by the D'Hondt method, a party-list proportional representation system.

General elections 
Election results:

2011

June 2015

November 2015

2018

Presidential elections

2014

2018

References 

Electoral districts of Turkey
Politics of Hakkâri Province